Niemirów may refer to the following places:
Niemirów, Biłgoraj County in Lublin Voivodeship (east Poland)
Niemirów, Chełm County in Lublin Voivodeship (east Poland)
Niemirów, Podlaskie Voivodeship (north-east Poland)
former name of Nemyriv in Ukraine